Cryptotendipes is a genus of holarctic non-biting midges in the subfamily Chironominae of the bloodworm family Chironomidae.

Species
C. ariel (Sublette, 1960)
C. casuarius (Townes, 1945)
C. darbyi (Sublette, 1960)
C. emorsus (Townes, 1945)
C. holsatus Lenz, 1959
C. nigronitens (Edwards, 1929)
C. pflugfelderi Reiss, 1964
C. pilicuspis Sæther, 1977
C. pseudotener Goethgebuer, 1922
C. usmaensis (Pagast, 1931)

References

Chironomidae
Nematocera genera